Palang Sara (also Romanized as Palang Sarā) is a village in Shanderman Rural District, Shanderman District, Masal County, Gilan Province, Iran. At the 2006 census, its population was 179, in 45 families.

References 

Populated places in Masal County